Charles Alexander Webster was Dean of Ross from 1926 to 1936.

Webster was educated at Trinity College, Dublin; and ordained in 1891. After  a curacy in Nohoval he held he held incumbencies at  Marmullane, Blackrock and Rathbarry. He was also a prebendary of St Patrick's Cathedral, Dublin.

References

Alumni of Trinity College Dublin
Deans of Ross, Ireland
20th-century Irish Anglican priests
19th-century Irish Anglican priests